The 2002 Arab Cup Final was a football match that took place on 30 December 2002, at the Al Kuwait Sports Club Stadium in Kuwait City, Kuwait, to determine the winner of the 2002 Arab Cup.
Saudi Arabia defeated Bahrain 1–0 after extra time to win their second Arab Cup consecutively.

Road to the final
In this edition, the ten qualified teams have been divided into two groups. The two future finalists, Saudi Arabia and Bahrain ended up in the same group B. Saudi Arabia finished first in the group ahead of Bahrain.
In the semi-final, Saudi Arabia beats Morocco and Bahrain beats Jordan and meet for a second time in the final.

Match
The Saudi national team maintained its title after becoming a champion of the 2002 Arab Cup soccer competition at Al Kuwait Sports Club Stadium in Kuwait City in the final match of the eighth edition.
Mohammed Noor scored the golden goal in the 94th minute with a header after a cross pass from Abdulaziz Al-Janoubi, housed in the left corner of bahraini goalkeeper Ali Hassan.
 
At the start of the match, the Bahraini team relied on pressure on the players of the Saudi team, and with the passage of minutes, the Saudi team succeeded in possessing the ball and carrying out coordinated attacks that were broken before it reached the area of goalkeeper Ali Hassan.
 
The Saudi team had the advantage in the second half and tried hard to shake the net of Bahrain goalkeeper, whose players relied on defense and rapid counterattacks led by Ahmed Hassan and Hussein Ali.
The game took place in the middle of the field during most of times of the match.
 
Algerian referee Mohamed Zekrini deprived Saudi Arabia from a penalty kick in the last minute when Mohamed Nour was pulled from the shirt inside the region, so his penalty was a yellow card, and the regular time ended with a goalless draw.
 
The Saudi team continued its pressure and succeeded in scoring the golden goal after a cross pass by Abdulaziz Al-Janoubi that Mohammed Noor reached over the defenders Salman Isa and the captain Faisal Abdulaziz and lodged it with his head in the left corner of goalkeeper Ali Hassan (94).
 
It is the second consecutive title for Saudi Arabia after winning the title of the last session in Doha at the expense of Qatar 3-1 in 1998, noting that it was entering the final for the third time after its 1992 loss to Egypt 2-3 in the Syrian city of Aleppo.

Details

References

External links
2002 Arab Cup - rsssf.com
 

F
2002
Nations
Nations
Saudi Arabia national football team matches
Bahrain national football team matches
December 2002 sports events in Asia
International association football competitions hosted by Kuwait